Local elections were held in the province of Cebu on May 9, 2022, as part of the 2022 Philippine general election. Voters selected from among candidates for all local positions: a town mayor, vice mayor and town councilors, as well as members of the Sangguniang Panlalawigan, the vice governor, governor and representatives for the seven districts of Cebu (including two districts of Cebu City, the lone district of Lapu-Lapu City and the lone district of Mandaue City).

Provincial elections
All incumbents are marked in Italics.

Governor
Joseph Felix Mari Durano, a former representative of Cebu's 5th congressional district and former secretary of Tourism, is challenging the re-election bid of incumbent governor Gwendolyn Garcia.

Vice governor
Incumbent vice governor Hilario Davide III is seeking for another term. He will be facing off against a newcomer in politics and doctor by profession, Maria Theresa Heyrosa.

Sangguniang Panlalawigan

1st District

 City: Carcar, Naga, Talisay
 Municipalities: Minglanilla, San Fernando, Sibonga

Incumbent board members Raul Bacaltos and Yolanda Daan are vying for a third term. Also running are Roger Cimafranca, Simplicio Danatil, and Ron Del Mar.

2nd District

 Municipalities: Alcoy, Argao, Boljoon, Dalaguete, Oslob, Samboan, Santander

Incumbent board members Edsel Galeos and Jose Mari Salvador are vying to succeed outgoing 2nd congressional district representative Wilfredo Caminero thereby making two seats up for grabs. Also running are Raymond Joseph Calderon, former Argao mayor Stanley Caminero, former DENR-7 regional director Isabelo Montejo, Robert Tambis, and Joseph Glenn Verano.

3rd District

 City: Toledo
 Municipalities: Aloguinsan, Asturias, Balamban, Barili, Pinamungajan, Tuburan

Incumbent board members John Ismael Borgonia and Victoria Corominas-Toribio are vying for a second and third term, respectively.  Also running is incumbent Pinamungajan councilor Jephthah Yapha.

4th District

 City: Bogo
 Municipalities: Bantayan, Daanbantayan, Madridejos, Medellin, San Remigio, Santa Fe, Tabogon, Tabuelan

Incumbent board members Horacio Paul Franco and Kerrie Keane Shimura are vying for a third and second term, respectively. Also running are Jose Brainard Mayol and Nelson Mondigo.

5th District

 City: Danao
 Municipalities: Borbon, Carmen, Catmon, Compostela, Liloan, Pilar, Poro, San Francisco, Sogod, Tudela

Incumbent board member Miguel Antonio Magpale is term-limited and running as councilor in Danao. Incumbent board member Andrei Duterte is vying for a second term. Also running are incumbent Danao councilor Jerard Almendras, former board member Jude Thaddeus Sybico, and Michael Joseph Villamor.

6th District

 Municipalities: Consolacion, Cordova

Incumbent board members Thadeo Jovito Ouano and Glenn Anthony Soco are vying for a third and second term, respectively. Also running is Frederico Garcia.

7th District

 Municipalities: Alcantara, Alegria, Badian, Dumanjug, Ginatilan, Malabuyoc, Moalboal, Ronda

Incumbent board member Christopher Baricuatro is term-limited. Incumbent board member Jerome Librando is vying for a third term. Baricuatro's father former Dumanjug mayor Cesar Baricuatro is running.

Congressional elections

1st District
Incumbent mayor of Talisay City Gerald Anthony Gullas Jr. initially sought to return as representative of Cebu's 1st congressional district. On November 14, he withdrew his candidacy to swap with his wife, Rhea Gullas, who eyed to succeed him as mayor.

2nd District
Incumbent representative Wilfredo Caminero is term-limited. Fellow board members Edsel Galeos and Jose Mari Salvador will be competing to succeed Caminero along with Leony Gregremosa of Partido Federal ng Pilipinas.

3rd District
Incumbent representative Pablo John Garcia is vying for a second term. He is running unopposed after Anthony Pono of PROMDI withdrew his candidacy on November 15.

4th District
Incumbent representative Janice Salimbangon is vying for a second term. She is running against former representative and incumbent ex officio board member Celestino Martinez III.

5th District
Incumbent representative Vincent Franco Frasco is vying for a second term. He is running against former representative Ramon Durano VI.

6th District
Incumbent representative Emmarie Ouano-Dizon is vying to become the first representative of the newly-created lone district of Mandaue City thereby making the 6th district an open seat. Five candidates will compete for the seat including Daphne Lagon, wife of incumbent Ako Bisaya representative Sonny Lagon.

7th District
Incumbent representative Peter John Calderon is vying for a second term and is running unopposed.

Cebu City

1st District
Actor Richard Yap is running again as 1st district representative after losing to the late Raul del Mar in the 2019 elections. Yap will face off with former party mate and incumbent city councilor Prisca Niña Mabatid and del Mar's daughter Rachel, who previously served as the district's representative from 2010 to 2013.

2nd District
BG Rodrigo Abellanosa is eyeing to succeed his father, incumbent district representative Rodrigo Abellanosa. He will face off against Eduardo Rama Jr., an incumbent city councilor and nephew of incumbent vice mayor Michael Rama.

Lapu-Lapu City

Incumbent representative Paz Radaza is eyeing a return as mayor of Lapu-Lapu City thereby making the lone district an open seat. Six candidates will compete for the seat including Maria Cynthia King-Chan, wife of incumbent mayor Junard Chan and incumbent city councilor Michael Dignos.

Mandaue City

Incumbent representative of 6th congressional district Emmarie Ouano-Dizon is vying to become the first representative of the newly-created lone district of Mandaue City and is running unopposed.

City and municipal elections

1st District, mayoral elections

Carcar
Incumbent mayor Mercedita Apura is vying as vice mayor, switching places with her husband incumbent vice mayor and former mayor Nicepuro Apura, who is running against incumbent councilor and former mayor Patrick Barcenas.

Naga City
Incumbent mayor Kristine Vanessa Chiong is not running. Her father, former mayor Valdemar Chiong is running against two candidates which includes former councilor Venci Del Mar.

Talisay City

Incumbent mayor Gerald Anthony Gullas Jr. is vying for a second term. He is running against incumbent vice mayor Alan Bucao.

Minglanilla
Incumbent mayor Elanito Peña is term-limited. Four candidates will compete for the seat which includes businessman Francis Gerard Cañedo, incumbent councilor Rajiv Enad, and incumbent vice mayor Loben Geonzon.

San Fernando
Incumbent mayor Lakambini Reluya is vying for a third term. She is running against incumbent councilor Mytha Ann Canoy.

Sibonga
Incumbent mayor Lionel Bacaltos is vying for a second term. He is running against two candidates.

2nd District, mayoral elections

Alcoy
Incumbent mayor Michael Sestoso is vying for a third term. He is running against engineer Jose Eugenio Singson.

Argao
Incumbent mayor Allan Sesaldo is vying for a second term. He is running against four candidates which includes outgoing representative of Cebu's 2nd congressional district Wilfredo Caminero.

Boljoon
Incumbent mayor Merlou Derama is term-limited. His cousin, incumbent Poblacion barangay captain and ex officio councilor Jojie Derama is running unopposed.

Dalaguete
Incumbent mayor Jeffrey Belciña is running for councilor thereby making it an open seat. Three candidates will compete for the seat which includes Jesson Belciña, former mayor Ronald Allan Cesante and incumbent councilor John Ritz Osorio.

Oslob
Incumbent mayor Jose Tumulak Jr. is vying for a third term. He is running against three candidates namely incumbent councilor Lucy Abines, incumbent vice mayor Christopher Amit, and former mayor Ronald Guaren.

Samboan
Incumbent mayor Emerito Calderon Jr. is vying for a third term. He is running against Aguinaldo Jesus Briones.

Santander
Incumbent mayor Marites Buscato is vying for a second term. She is running against two candidates.

3rd District, mayoral elections

Toledo City
Incumbent mayor Marjorie Perales is vying for a second term. She is running against incumbent councilor Mansueto Birao and incumbent Biga barangay captain Pedro Sepada Jr.

Aloguinsan
Incumbent mayor Cesare Ignatius Moreno is vying for a second term. He is running against Roel Manguilimotan.

Asturias
Incumbent mayor Jose Antonio Pintor is vying for a third term. He is running against former councilor Clavel Serognas and Dana Andrew Dumdum.

Balamban
Incumbent mayor Alex Binghay is not running. His son, former mayor Ace Binghay is running unopposed.

Barili
Incumbent mayor Julieto Flores, who assumed office after the death of former mayor Marlon Garcia, is running for his first full three-year term. He is running against incumbent councilor and son of the former mayor, Pablo John Garcia IV.

Pinamungajan
Incumbent mayor Glenn Baricuatro is term-limited. His wife, incumbent councilor Ana Jessica Baricuatro is running against incumbent councilor Salipada Cerna.

Tuburan
Incumbent mayor Danilo Diamante is vying as vice mayor, switching places with his brother incumbent vice mayor and former mayor Democrito Diamante, who is running unopposed.

4th District, mayoral elections

Bogo
Incumbent mayor Carlo Jose Martinez is vying for a third term. He is running against defeated 2019 vice gubernatorial candidate Daphne Salimbangon.

Bantayan
Incumbent mayor Arthur Despi is vying for a second term. He is running against two candidates which includes former mayor Geralyn Escario-Cañares.

Daanbantayan
Incumbent mayor Sun Shimura is vying for a second term. He is running against former councilor Renillo Gullem.

Madridejos
Incumbent mayor Salvador Dela Fuente is vying for a second term. He is running against engineer Romeo Villaceran.

Medellin
Incumbent mayor Joven Mondigo Jr. is vying for a third term. He is running against Francis Eric Sucro.

San Remigio
Incumbent mayor Mariano Martinez is term-limited. His son, incumbent councilor Miguel Maria Martinez is running against incumbent vice mayor Alfonso Pestolante.

Santa Fe
Incumbent mayor Ithamar Espinosa is vying for a second term. He is running against three candidates which includes former mayor Jose Esgana and incumbent vice mayor Naomi Espinosa.

Tabogon
Incumbent mayor Zigfred Duterte is term-limited. His wife, incumbent councilor Gloria Duterte is running against incumbent vice mayor Leonardo Arpon and incumbent councilor Francis Salimbangon.

Tabuelan
Incumbent mayor Raul Gerona is vying for a second term. He is running against Fe Oca.

5th District, mayoral elections
Incumbent mayor Ramon Durano III is term-limited. His son, incumbent vice mayor Thomas Mark Durano is running against two candidates.

Danao

Borbon
Incumbent mayor Noel Dotillos is vying for a third term. He is running against three candidates.

Carmen
Incumbent mayor Carlo Villamor is vying for a second term. He is running against Antonio Awing.

Catmon
Incumbent mayor Irish Baylon-Gestopa is vying for a second term. She is running against Avis Monleon.

Compostela
Incumbent mayor Froilan Quiño is vying as vice mayor. His uncle, incumbent councilor Felijur Quiño is running against three candidates namely former mayor Joel Quiño, former mayor Ritchie Wagas, and incumbent councilor Ma. Madeline Yuson-Pepito.

Liloan
Incumbent mayor Maria Esperanza Christina Frasco is vying for a third term. She is running against retired regional trial court judge Ulric Cañete. Although reelected, Christina Frasco will assume as Secretary of the Department of Tourism effective June 30. Reelected Vice-mayor Aljew Frasco will assume as Mayor of Liloan.

Pilar
Incumbent mayor Manuel Santiago is vying for a second term. He is running against lawyer Joseph Malaluan.

Poro
Incumbent mayor Edgar Rama is vying for a second term. He is running against his uncle, incumbent vice mayor and former mayor Luciano Rama Jr.

San Francisco
Incumbent mayor Alfredo Arquillano Jr. is vying for a second term. He is running against former councilor Hector Capao.

Sogod
Incumbent mayor Richard Streegan is vying as vice mayor. His wife, incumbent vice mayor and former mayor Lissa Marie Streegan is running against two candidates.

Tudela
Incumbent mayor Greman Solante is vying for a second term. He is running against two candidates which includes incumbent councilor Cyrus Otadoy.

6th District, mayoral elections

Consolacion
Incumbent mayor Joannes Alegado is not running. His mother, former mayor and incumbent vice mayor Teresa Alegado is running against three candidates.

Cordova
Incumbent mayor Mary Therese Cho is vying for a third term. She is running against four candidates which includes incumbent councilor Cesar Suan.

7th District, mayoral elections

Alcantara
Incumbent mayor Fritz Lastimoso is vying for a second term. He is running against former mayor Benjamin Lobitaña.

Alegria
Incumbent mayor Verna Magallon is term-limited. Her husband, incumbent vice mayor Gilberto Magallon is running against four candidates which includes former mayor Raul Guisadio.

Badian
Incumbent mayor Carmencita Lumain is vying for a third term. She is running against two candidates which includes incumbent councilor Mark Andrew Jorolan.

Dumanjug
Incumbent mayor Efren Gica is vying for a third term. He is running against Rizalina Zozobrado.

Ginatilan
Incumbent mayor Dean Michael Singco is term-limited. His brother, incumbent councilor Roy Vincent Singco is running unopposed.

Malabuyoc
Incumbent mayor Lito Creus is term-limited. His wife, former mayor and incumbent councilor Daisy Creus is running against Santo Niño barangay captain Erlinda Piedad.

Moalboal
Incumbent mayor Paz Rozgoni is vying to return as vice mayor, switching places with incumbent vice mayor and former mayor Inocentes Cabaron, who is running against two candidates.

Ronda
Incumbent mayor Terence Blanco is vying for a second term and is running unopposed.

Cebu City, mayoral election

Margarita Osmeña, a former city councilor and wife of former mayor Tomas Osmeña, is challenging incumbent mayor Michael Rama for the position of mayor. Rama assumed the post after the death of mayor Edgardo Labella. Outgoing city councilor David Tumulak has also joined the race as an independent candidate.

Lapu-Lapu City, mayoral election

Incumbent mayor Junard Chan is vying for a second term. He is running against former mayor and incumbent representative of Lapu-Lapu's lone district Paz Radaza.

Mandaue City, mayoral election

Incumbent mayor Jonas Cortes is vying for a second term. He is running against former city councilor Nilo Seno.

References

External links
COMELEC official website

2022 Philippine local elections
Elections in Cebu
May 2022 events in the Philippines